Churchman Brook Dam is an earthfill embankment dam approximately  south east of Perth, Western Australia in the City of Armadale. The reservoir is a water source for Perth.

Construction of the dam commenced in 1923 and was completed in 1929; the resident engineer was Sir Russell John Dumas.

See also
Darling Scarp
List of reservoirs and dams in Australia

References

External links
Churchman Brook Catchment Area Drinking Water Source Protection Plan – Integrated Water Supply System, Department of Water, Government of Western Australia, Water Resource Protection Series Report No. WRP 66.

History of Western Australia
Darling Range
Dams completed in 1929
Embankment dams
Dams in Western Australia
Reservoirs in Western Australia